One ship of the Royal Navy has borne the name HMS Begum, whilst another was planned:

 HMS Begum was to have been an escort carrier.
She was launched in 1942, returned to the US Navy in 1946 and sold in 1947.

Royal Navy ship names